Pièce du Procès de Pablo Ocelotl et ses Fils (French for "Part of the Lawsuit of Pablo Ocelotl and his Children") is a colonial Mexican indigenous pictorial manuscript, originally used in a 1565 court case between the Matlatzinca Alonso González and the Nahua Pablo Ocelotl.

The manuscript is held by the Bibliothèque nationale de France.

See also
Aztec codices

References

Mesoamerican codices
Bibliothèque nationale de France collections